Paresky Commons (colloquially known as "Commons") is Phillips Academy's main dining facility. Designed by architect Charles Platt and constructed by Thompson Starrett, Commons was built in the 1920s Colonial Revival style. Located in Flagstaff Quadrangle (designed by the Olmsted brothers), it is the social hub of Andover. Today, Commons aims to serve healthy food from diverse backgrounds while still accounting for dietary needs and sustainability.

History 

In 1928, Thomas Cochran donated $300,000 on the condition that the trustees could raise another $300,000. Once opened, the academy instituted the policy where each grade level would have a special room for themselves. The remnants of this policy still last today as 9th and 10th graders typically sit upstairs ("upper") while 11th and 12th graders sit on the base level ("lower").

The dining facility has undergone four major renovations in recent history. First, in 1970 a $125,000 renovation separated the dishwashing and food serving, installed of conveyor belts to pick up dirty dishes and cups, and reorganized the serving lines. Then, in 1980 a renovation for a bit under $2 million added a student center and snack bar in the basement. Recently, a 2007 renovation, cost $30 million which renovated bathrooms, updated color schemes, improved air quality, serving areas and lighting. After this renovation, the building was renamed in honor of David Paresky ’56 whose $10 million donation helped to finance to renovation. In 2011, Commons earned LEED Silver certification after installing energy saving technologies.

References 

Phillips Academy
1930 establishments
Leadership in Energy and Environmental Design basic silver certified buildings